Akçeşme can refer to:

 Akçeşme, Çanakkale
 Akçeşme, İncirliova
 Akçeşme, Keşan